Reflections  is a recording by American guitarists Chet Atkins and Doc Watson. The two musical legends team up on ten songs.

Reception

Writing for Allmusic, music critic Michael B. Smith called the release a "deeply personal recording" and wrote of the album "Two of the finest guitarists the world has ever produced are together on one fun-filled record."

Reissues
 Originally released on RCA, it was reissued on CD by Sugar Hill Records.

Track listing

Side one
 "Dill Pickle Rag" (Traditional) – 2:33
 "Me and Chet Made a Record" (Chet Atkins, Doc Watson) – 2:35
 "Flatt Did It" (Atkins, Watson) – 2:13
 "Medley: Tennessee Rag/Beaumont Rag" (Traditional) – 2:26
 "Medley: Texas Gales/Old Joe Clark" (Traditional) – 3:10

Side two
 "You're Gonna Be Sorry" (Delmore, Delmore) – 2:21
 "Goodnight Waltz" – 2:56
 "Don't Monkey 'Round My Widder" (Karl Davis) – 3:29
 "Medley: Black and White/Ragtime Annie" (Atkins, Watson) – 2:39
 "On My Way to Canaan's Land" (Traditional) – 3:05

Personnel
Chet Atkins – guitar, vocals
Doc Watson - guitar, vocals
T. Michael Coleman - bass
Terry McMillan - percussion
Jerry Shook - guitar

References

External links
A Doc Watson discography

1980 albums
Chet Atkins albums
Doc Watson albums
Albums produced by Chet Atkins
RCA Records albums